Pierre Judex Lefou (born 24 June 1966) is a Mauritian former hurdler who competed in the 1988 Summer Olympics, in the 1992 Summer Olympics, and in the 1996 Summer Olympics.

International competitions

References

External links
 

1966 births
Living people
Mauritian Creoles
Mauritian male hurdlers
Commonwealth Games competitors for Mauritius
Olympic athletes of Mauritius
Athletes (track and field) at the 1988 Summer Olympics
Athletes (track and field) at the 1992 Summer Olympics
Athletes (track and field) at the 1994 Commonwealth Games
Athletes (track and field) at the 1996 Summer Olympics
African Games gold medalists for Mauritius
African Games medalists in athletics (track and field)
Athletes (track and field) at the 1987 All-Africa Games
Athletes (track and field) at the 1991 All-Africa Games